Pierre-Joseph Macquer (9 October 1718 – 15 February 1784) was an influential French chemist.

He is known for his Dictionnaire de chymie (1766). He was also involved in practical applications, to medicine and industry, such as the French development of porcelain. He worked as a chemist in industries, such as the Manufacture de Sèvres or the Gobelins Manufactory. He was an opponent of Lavoisier's theories. The scholar Phillipe Macquer was his brother.

In 1752 Macquer showed that the pigment Prussian blue could be decomposed by alkaline solutions into a solid iron hydroxide compound and an aqueous solution of Ferrocyanide.

In his 1749 Elemens de Chymie Theorique, Macquer builds on Geoffroy's 1718 affinity table, by devoting a whole chapter to the topic of chemical affinity:

He became adjunct Chemist at the French Academy of Sciences the 5th of April 1745. He later became Associate Chemist in 1766 before being granted the permanent Chair of Chemistry in 1772. In 1768, Macquer was elected a foreign member of the Royal Swedish Academy of Sciences. In 1775, he was elected a member to the American Philosophical Society.

Macquer's salt, also named monopotassium arsenate (KH2AsO4) is named in his honor.

Works

 1756: Elemens de Chymietheoretique 
 1766: Dictionnaire portatif des arts et metiers, volume 1
 1766: Dictionnaire portatif des arts et metiers, volume 2

References

External links
 Macquer, Pierre-Joseph (1718–1784)

1718 births
1784 deaths
18th-century French chemists
Members of the French Academy of Sciences
Members of the Royal Swedish Academy of Sciences
Members of the American Philosophical Society